Kamarabuyon is a settlement in Kenya's Baringo County.

References 

Populated places in Baringo County